In medicine, the ratio of physiologic dead space over tidal volume (VD/VT) is a routine measurement, expressing the ratio of dead-space ventilation (VD) to tidal ventilation (VT), as in physiologic research or the care of patients with respiratory disease.

Equation

References 

Mechanical ventilation